The following is a list of Nippon Professional Baseball players with the last name starting with Y, retired or active.

Y
Keiichi Yabu
Yasuhiko Yabuta
Masaki Yachi
Atsushi Yachida
Hiroshi Yagi
Tomoya Yagi
Tsuyoshi Yaginuma
Sohroku Yagisawa
Tetsuo Yaguchi
Futoshi Yamabe
Akichika Yamada
Hiroki Yamada - born 1988
Hiroki Yamada  - born 1989
Hiroshi Yamada
Hisashi Yamada
Jun Yamada
Katsuhiko Yamada
Kazutoshi Yamada
Kazuyuki Yamada
Ken Yamada
Kikuo Yamada
Koji Yamada
Shinsuke Yamada
Takashi Yamada
Tsutomu Yamada
Yuji Yamada
Minoru Yamagishi
Kazuo Yamaguchi
Kosuke Yamaguchi
Koji Yamaguchi
Shigeyuki Yamaguchi
Shun Yamaguchi
Susumu Yamaguchi
Tetsuya Yamaguchi
Yūji Yamaguchi
Kazutoshi Yamahara
Daisuke Yamai
Tomoyuki Yamaji
Shigetoshi Yamakita
Ayumu Yamamoto
Eiji Yamamoto
Hiroaki Yamamoto
Hitoshi Yamamoto
Jun Yamamoto
Kazunori Yamamoto - born 1957
Kazunori Yamamoto - born 1983
Kazuyoshi Yamamoto
Kenju Yamamoto
Koji Yamamoto - born 1946
Koji Yamamoto - born 1951
Masahiro Yamamoto
Mitsunobu Yamamoto
Sho Yamamoto
Shogo Yamamoto
Takuji Yamamoto
Tatsuki Yamamoto
Yasushi Yamamoto
Yoshihiko Yamamoto
Hiroki Yamamura
Michinao Yamamura
Kiyoshi Yamanaka
Tatsuya Yamanaka
Masahito Yamane
Yoshinobu Yamane
Kazuaki Yamano
Hiroyuki Yamaoka
Ken Yamasaki
Koji Yamasaki
Shintaro Yamasaki
Takeshi Yamasaki
Daisuke Yamashita
Hironobu Yamashita
Katsumi Yamashita
Kazuhiko Yamashita
Kazuteru Yamashita
Norihito Yamashita
Kazuhiro Yamauchi
Keita Yamauchi
Soma Yamauchi
Yasuyuki Yamauchi
Yoshihiro Yamauchi
Kaname Yamazaki
Katsuki Yamazaki
Kazuharu Yamazaki
Kenichi Yamazaki
Kenta Yamazaki
Masataka Yamazaki
Satoshi Yamazaki
Takahiro Yamazaki - born 1976
Takahiro Yamazaki - born 1978
Esteban Yan
Yao-Hsun Yang
Masao Yanada
Masatoshi Yanagida
Shigeo Yanagida
Yuichi Yanagisawa
Shikato Yanagita
Akihiro Yanase
Dai-Kang Yang
Akihiro Yano
Eiji Yano
Kenji Yano
Masayuki Yano
Minoru Yano
Satoshi Yano
Shuhei Yano
Ed Yarnall
Kaname Yashiki
Hideyuki Yasuda
Masatoshi Yasuhara
Kohichi Yasui
Tsuyoshi Yoda
Tetsu Yohfu
Minoru Yojoh
Fuminori Yokogawa
Yusuke Yokokawa
Toshikazu Yokomatsu
Hisanori Yokota
Masashi Yokota
Akimasa Yokotani
Ryuji Yokoyama
Ryunosuke Yokoyama
Tetsuya Yokoyama
Yukiya Yokoyama
Kaname Yonamine
Masahide Yone
Tetsuya Yoneda
Kazuki Yonemura
Tomohito Yoneno
Kunji Yonezaki
Atsushi Yoshida
Hiroshi Yoshida
Kei Yoshida
Kota Yoshida
Naoki Yoshida
Shintaro Yoshida
Shuji Yoshida
Takashi Yoshida
Tohru Yoshida
Toyohiko Yoshida
Yasuo Yoshida
Yoshio Yoshida
Yukihiro Yoshida
Eishiro Yoshie
Kosuke Yoshihara
Michiomi Yoshihara
Masato Yoshii
Katsunari Yoshikawa
Masahiro Yoshikawa
Mitsuo Yoshikawa
Motohiro Yoshikawa
Teruaki Yoshikawa
Kazuki Yoshimi
Taichi Yoshimi
Yuji Yoshimi
Kazuyoshi Yoshimoto
Ryo Yoshimoto - born 1969
Ryo Yoshimoto - born 1980
Shinji Yoshimoto
Kazuhito Yoshimura
Masaki Yoshimura
Sadaaki Yoshimura
Yuki Yoshimura
Koichiro Yoshinaga
Makoto Yoshino
Yuji Yoshioka
Haruki Yoshitake
Shintaro Yoshitake
Takinori Yoshitoshi
Kenji Yoshitsuru
Masaru Yoshizaki
Ernie Young
Tim Young
Wen-bin Yu
Yoshio Yuasa
Toshiro Yufune
Hiroshi Yugamidani
Tatsuhiro Yuminaga

External links
Japanese Baseball

 Y